Nanglo's Bakery Cafe is a restaurant chain in Nepal. The chain is recognized in Nepal as an entriprise to employ deaf people as waiter and waitresses. The first cafe of the chain was established in 1991 at Teendhara, Kathmandu. Nanglo during its early days was considered to be a trend setter in the restaurant culture in Nepal.

Currently, it owns cafes at Boudha, Bhatbhateni, Dharahara, Gwarko, Jawalakhel, Maharajgunj, New Baneswor, Pulchowk, Teendhara and Teku. It also has branches in Butwal and Tansen. Its flagship restaurant at Durbarmarg was closed in 2014 due to expiry of lease contract.  There are more than 14 branches of the café within and outside of Kathmandu, making it one of the largest and most popular restaurant chains in Nepal.

History
The original name of the cafe was the Bakery Cafe which was established in 1973. It is one of the early cafe established in Nepal. 
During that time, it was even difficult to find the buns and breads in Nepal. This led to opening of bakery factory by its owner in 1982, to supply the bakery products for the restaurant. In 1991, the restaurant was officially registered.

Social significance
The chain took the initiative to hire deaf people to run the restaurant in 1997 when they opened their chain at New Baneshowor. Initially, it was an experiment, and the disabled were trained by the owner himself. Later, when the company decided to hire them permanently, a formal training was conducted to teach them English and sign language. The Hotel Association of Nepal and the Austrian-Salzburg Hotel Management School conducted the training. These waiters and waitresses can take order using gestures bivalent with Nepali Sign Language.

The cafe also served as a meeting point for various political activities in Nepal during the democratic movement in 1990s.

Stores
The group has restaurants in the following locations:
 Kathmandu
 New Baneshwor
Boudha
 Bhatbhateni
 Dharahara
 Gwarko
 Jawalakhel
 Maharajgunj
 Teendhara 
 Teku
 Lalitpur
 Jawalakhel
 Butwal 
 Tansen (known as Nanglo West)

Controversies
 In 2016, an illegal bakery factory was found to operate in Sanepa using licence of Thaiba.

References

Food and drink companies of Nepal
1991 establishments in Nepal